= Paolo Shoes =

American corporation

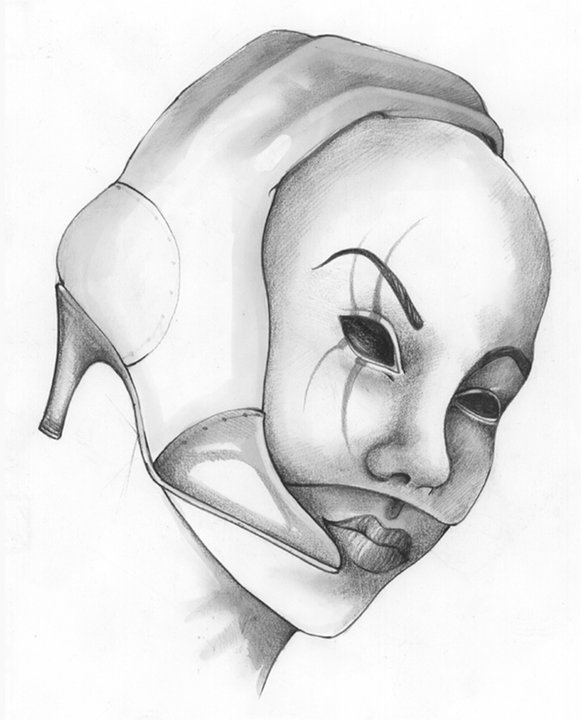
- Actual logo
- Company type: Private
- Founded: 1999 San Francisco, California
- Founder: Paolo Iantorno
- Headquarters: California, America
- Area served: Worldwide
- Brands: Paolo Shoes, Platinum Design Group and Duke et Duchess.
- Website: paoloshoes.com

Paolo (founded 1999) is a private American corporation that owns and operates shoes and accessory retail stores in California and sells worldwide over their internet site. Paolo works under three different labels, Paolo Shoes, Platinum Design Group, and Duke et Duchess.

== History ==
Paolo Shoes was founded in San Francisco, California opening its first freestanding store in November 1999. All Shoes are designed and hand crafted by shoe artisans from northern to southern Italy. Each pair are handmade using skins of exotic nature, leathers and soles used for production have all been certified by C.I.T.E.S.
